The Glassblower's Children is a Swedish film, first intended to open on 25 December 1996, but ending up released to cinemas in Sweden on 27 February 1998, directed by Anders Grönros. It is based on the novel with the same name by Maria Gripe.

Cast
 Stellan Skarsgård – Albert
 Pernilla August – Sofia
 Thommy Berggren – the Emperor
 Elin Klinga – the Empress
 Lena Granhagen – Flaxa Mildväder
 Oliver P. Peldius – Klas
 Jasmine Heikura – Klara
 Ann-Cathrin Palme – Nana
 Måns Westfelt – the coachman
 Ewa Fröling – Nana (voice)
 Johan Ulveson –  Kloke (voice)
 Helge Jordal – the glass-seller
 Margreth Weivers – the doll-selleress
 Martin Lange – a butler
 Peter Nystedt – a butler

References

External links
 
 

Danish children's films
Norwegian children's films
Swedish children's films
Norwegian drama films
Swedish drama films
Danish drama films
1990s Swedish films